Indochine may refer to:

Indochina, a region in Southeast Asia roughly east of India and south of China
French Indochina, the part of the French colonial empire in Indochina
Indochine (band), a French new wave/rock band, formed in 1981
Indochine (film), a 1992 French film